Elections to Hyndburn Borough Council were held on 1 May 2003. One third of the council was up for election and the Conservative party gained overall control of the council from the Labour party. Overall turnout was 51.5%.

After the election, the composition of the council was
Conservative 18
Labour 17

Election result

Ward results

References
2003 Hyndburn election result
Tory win 'the best birthday present'
Ward results

2003 English local elections
2003
2000s in Lancashire